Yana Mikhailovna Vagner (born 8 October 1973, in Moscow) is a Russian writer and journalist, best known for her novel Vongozero (2011), which was adapted into the Russian series To the Lake on Netflix.

References 

1973 births
Living people
21st-century Russian women writers
Writers from Moscow
Journalists from Moscow